The Tainan City Zuojhen Fossil Park is a gallery about fossil in Zhuozhen District, Tainan, Taiwan.

History
The gallery was established by the consolidation of former Tsai-liao Fossil Museum, the Natural History Educational Hall and Guangrong Elementary School. It was opened on 12 May 2019.

Architecture
The gallery spans over an area of 9,000 m2 and consists of five exhibition spaces.

See also
 Prehistory of Taiwan

References

External links

 

2019 establishments in Taiwan
Buildings and structures completed in 2019
Buildings and structures in Tainan
Fossil museums